Magaza Masanchi (27 July 1886 – 3 March 1937; Cyrillic Dungan: Магәзы Масанчын), Magaza Masanchin (Cyrillic Dungan: Магәзы Масанчын), or Ma Sanqi (Chinese: 馬三奇), was a Dungan communist revolutionary commander and Statesman in the Soviet Union. He participated in the Russian Revolution on the Bolshevik side. Karakunuz in Kazakhstan was renamed Masanchi after him. He was a victim of the Great Purge by Joseph Stalin.

Career 
Masanchi was born in Alma-Ata and his father was a farmworker.

During the Russian Civil War the Bolsheviks were interested in seeking the support of the non Russian Central Asian peoples. Dungans were invited to join the Red Army.

Dungans residing in town joined the Red Army after serving in the Tsarist forces when going back to Pishpek, fighting for the Soviets in Semirech'ye. However, Dungan peasants were apathetic to both sides in the Civil War, it was reported that the Bolsheviks committed atrocities against the indigenous inhabitants of Central Asia. On the side of the White Russians were Rich Dungans and the Islamic Dungan clerics.

Masanchi originally took part in World War I as a member of the Russian Imperial Army. After the Tsar was overthrown he went to Tashkent.

Masanchi commanded the Dungan Cavalry Regiment of the Red Army and was distinguished for his fighting against counter revolutionaries in Kazakhstan. Magaza Masanchi fought for the Soviet Union with Dmitry Furmanov. He became an official in Uzbekistan and Kazakhstan after the Civil War.

After going to the 1921 Third Congress of the Comintern Masanchi battled the Basmachi movement. He was also a member of the Soviet secret police.

Masanchi was a victim of the Stalinist Great Purge. He was rehabilitated later.

References 

Soviet Army officers
1886 births
1937 deaths
Communist Party of the Soviet Union members
Old Bolsheviks
Members of the Communist Party of the Soviet Union executed by the Soviet Union
Executed military personnel
Great Purge victims from Kazakhstan
People of the Russian Civil War
People of the Russian Revolution
Russian military personnel of World War I
Russian people of Hui descent
Russian revolutionaries
Soviet rehabilitations
People from Almaty